Vauhkonen is a Finnish surname. Notable people with the surname include:

Olavi Vauhkonen (born 1989), Finnish ice hockey player
Vilho Vauhkonen (1877–1957), Finnish sport shooter

Finnish-language surnames